Maree Lowes (born March 30, 1987) is an Australian actress. She is best known for appearing as "dirtgirl" in the multi-award-winning children's TV show dirtgirlworld and Get Grubby TV.

Career
Maree Lowes is the star of the animated series dirtgirlworld, which has aired in 128 countries and is an Emmy Award-winning series. dirtgirlworld later evolved into the live action series and hit show aired on ABC TV, get grubby TV.

In 2016, Lowes made her debut on stage at the Sydney Opera House as 'dirtgirl' in the musical 'Get Grubby - dirtgirl's eco musical'.

Other credits include the NRL educational series "He Said, She Said", short films such as Prairie (2020), The Last Stupid Thing, #goodtimes and Waiting For the Turning Of the Earth whose ensemble cast included Barry Otto, Rhys Muldoon and Anne Louise-Lambert.

Lowes has also worked as a content creator, 1st Assistant Director, Producer in music and TV and a Music Video stylist.

References

External links
 
 http://www.mareelowes.com/

21st-century Australian actresses
Living people
People from Grafton, New South Wales
1987 births